The Portland LumberJax (sometimes referred to as the Jax) were a professional lacrosse team in the National Lacrosse League (NLL), which started playing in the 2006 season and ended operations after the 2009 season. Angela Batinovich, the owner of the team, entered the league as the youngest owner of a professional sports franchise at the age of 24.  Announced by the NLL on May 11, 2005, the LumberJax played their home games at the Rose Garden in Portland, Oregon. It was announced on May 4, 2009 that the team would be leaving Portland after four seasons of play and on July 7, 2009 the NLL held a dispersal draft for the Lumberjax players.

Franchise history

The expansion LumberJax got off to a slow start in their first year, but later turned their season around and made it to the playoffs with an 11-5 record. The LumberJax finished first in their division, becoming the only expansion team to win their division in the 20-year history of the NLL. The LumberJax season ended with a loss in the opening round of the playoffs to the Arizona Sting.

The LumberJax were less successful in their sophomore season, finishing last in the West Division with a 4-12 record.

In their third year, the LumberJax finished with a sub-500 record for the second straight year (6-10), but were able to enter the playoffs as the fourth-seed in the West.

The LumberJax won their first playoff game in franchise history on May 4, 2008, an 18-16 victory over the San Jose Stealth at the HP Pavilion in San Jose, California. Dan Dawson scored 7 goals and added 5 assists for a total of 12 points.  They then defeated the Calgary Roughnecks in the Western Division Final 16-12, to earn their first ever trip to the Champion's Cup, which took place Saturday, May 17, 2008 at the HSBC Arena in Buffalo, New York against the Buffalo Bandits at 7:30 PM Eastern. The LumberJax lost 14-13.

On May 4, 2009 the team announced it would be leaving Portland after four seasons of play due to financial concerns. Future options included moving the franchise to another city or selling it to new owners; however on July 7, 2009, a dispersal draft was held for Portland's players, essentially shutting down the franchise.

Awards and honors

All-time record

Playoff results

See also
 Portland LumberJax seasons
 Portland LumberJax players

References

 
Defunct National Lacrosse League teams
Lacrosse clubs established in 2005
Lacrosse clubs disestablished in 2009
Defunct sports teams in Oregon
LumberJax
Lacrosse teams in Oregon
2005 establishments in Oregon
2009 disestablishments in Oregon